Alfred Thomas Green (17 June 1913 – 27 January 1981) was an Australian artist. He was a painter, printmaker and art teacher.

His work is held in the collection of the Art Gallery of New South Wales, Christchurch Art Gallery, and the University of New South Wales.

References

1913 births
1980 deaths
20th-century Australian painters
20th-century Australian male artists
People from Warwickshire
Australian printmakers
Australian art teachers
Australian male painters